Polyclinella is a genus of colonial sea squirts, tunicates in the family Polyclinidae.

Species
The World Register of Marine Species lists the following species:
Polyclinella azemai Harant, 1930

References

Enterogona
Tunicate genera